The 2000–01 NBA season was the Mavericks' 21st season in the National Basketball Association. During the off-season, the Mavericks acquired Christian Laettner and Loy Vaught from the Detroit Pistons in two separate trades, acquired Howard Eisley from the Utah Jazz, and acquired top draft pick Courtney Alexander from the Orlando Magic. In their final season at the Reunion Arena, the Mavericks won ten of their first fifteen games, and played above .500 for the entire season, holding a 31–19 record at the All-Star break. At midseason, the team traded Laettner, Vaught and Alexander along with Hubert Davis, and top draft pick Etan Thomas (who missed the entire season with a toe injury, and never played for the Mavericks) to the Washington Wizards in exchange for Juwan Howard and second-year center Calvin Booth, as the team signed free agent Vernon Maxwell, who was previously released by the Philadelphia 76ers. The Mavericks finished third in the Midwest Division with a 53–29 record, and made their first playoff appearance since the 1989–90 season, ending a ten-year playoff drought.

Dirk Nowitzki averaged 21.8 points and 9.2 rebounds per game, and was named to the All-NBA Third Team, while Michael Finley averaged 21.5 points, 5.2 rebounds, 4.4 assists and 1.4 steals per game, and was selected for the 2001 NBA All-Star Game, which was his second and final All-Star selection, and Steve Nash showed improvement averaging 15.6 points and 7.3 assists per game. In addition, Eisley contributed 9.0 points and 3.6 assists per game, and Shawn Bradley provided the team with 7.1 points, 7.4 rebounds and 2.8 blocks per game. Nash finished in third place in Most Improved Player voting, while Nowitzki finished tied in fifth place.

In the Western Conference First Round, the Mavericks trailed 2–0 to the 4th-seeded Utah Jazz, but managed to win the next three games, thus winning the series 3–2, and winning their first playoff series since 1988. However, they would lose in the Western Conference Semi-finals to the San Antonio Spurs in five games. Following the season, Eisley was traded to the New York Knicks, while Gary Trent signed with the Minnesota Timberwolves, Booth signed with the Seattle SuperSonics, and Maxwell retired.

Draft picks

Roster

Roster Notes
 Center Shawn Bradley holds both American and German citizenship.

Regular season

Standings

z = clinched division title
y = clinched division title
x = clinched playoff spot

Record vs. opponents

Game log

Playoffs

|- align="center" bgcolor="#ffcccc"
| 1
| April 21
| @ Utah
| L 86–88
| Michael Finley (26)
| Dirk Nowitzki (12)
| Steve Nash (7)
| Delta Center19,100
| 0–1
|- align="center" bgcolor="#ffcccc"
| 2
| April 24
| @ Utah
| L 98–109
| Michael Finley (32)
| Bradley, Finley (8)
| Steve Nash (6)
| Delta Center19,911
| 0–2
|- align="center" bgcolor="#ccffcc"
| 3
| April 28
| Utah
| W 94–91
| Dirk Nowitzki (33)
| Juwan Howard (11)
| Steve Nash (7)
| Reunion Arena18,187
| 1–2
|- align="center" bgcolor="#ccffcc"
| 4
| May 1
| Utah
| W 107–77
| Dirk Nowitzki (33)
| Michael Finley (12)
| Steve Nash (7)
| Reunion Arena18,300
| 2–2
|- align="center" bgcolor="#ccffcc"
| 5
| May 3
| @ Utah
| W 84–83
| Michael Finley (33)
| Juwan Howard (8)
| Steve Nash (7)
| Delta Center19,911
| 3–2
|-

|- align="center" bgcolor="#ffcccc"
| 1
| May 5
| @ San Antonio
| L 78–94
| Michael Finley (17)
| Shawn Bradley (12)
| Steve Nash (6)
| Alamodome32,798
| 0–1
|- align="center" bgcolor="#ffcccc"
| 2
| May 7
| @ San Antonio
| L 86–100
| Michael Finley (24)
| Juwan Howard (11)
| Michael Finley (7)
| Alamodome27,690
| 0–2
|- align="center" bgcolor="#ffcccc"
| 3
| May 9
| San Antonio
| L 90–104
| Dirk Nowitzki (15)
| Greg Buckner (12)
| Michael Finley (5)
| Reunion Arena18,237
| 0–3
|- align="center" bgcolor="#ccffcc"
| 4
| May 12
| San Antonio
| W 112–108
| Dirk Nowitzki (30)
| Dirk Nowitzki (9)
| Steve Nash (14)
| Reunion Arena18,187
| 1–3
|- align="center" bgcolor="#ffcccc"
| 5
| May 14
| @ San Antonio
| L 87–105
| Dirk Nowitzki (42)
| Dirk Nowitzki (18)
| Eisley, Finley (4)
| Alamodome25,853
| 1–4
|-

Player statistics

Season

Playoffs

Awards and records
 Dirk Nowitzki, All-NBA Third Team
 Michael Finley, NBA All-Star Game

Transactions

References

Dallas Mavericks seasons
Dallas
Dallas
Dallas